Emmy Noether was a German mathematician who flourished in the early 20th century. This article is dedicated to the things named after her achievements.

Mathematics

"Noetherian"
 Noetherian
 Noetherian group
 Noetherian module
 Noetherian ring
 Noetherian space
 Noetherian induction
 Noetherian scheme

Other

Astronomy

 The crater Nöther on the far side of the Moon is named after her.
 The 7001 Noether asteroid also is named for her.

References

nother